The Canadian five-cent coin, commonly called a nickel, is a coin worth five cents or one-twentieth of a Canadian dollar.  It was patterned on the corresponding coin in the neighbouring United States.  It became the smallest-valued coin in the currency upon the discontinuation of the penny in 2013. Due to inflation, the purchasing power of the nickel continues to drop and currently the coin represents less than 0.5% of the country's lowest minimum hourly wage.

The denomination (i.e., the Canadian five-cent piece) had been introduced in 1858 as a small, thin sterling silver coin, that was colloquially known as a "fish scale", not a nickel. The larger base metal version made of nickel, and called a "nickel", was introduced as a Canadian coin in 1922, originally as 99.9% nickel metal. These coins were magnetic, due to the high nickel content. Versions during World War II were minted in tombac (a copper-zinc alloy), then chrome and nickel-plated steel, and finally returned again to nickel at the end of the war. A plated steel version was again made from 1951 to 1954 during the Korean War. Rising nickel prices eventually caused another switch to cupronickel in 1982 (an alloy similar to the US nickel), but more recently, Canadian nickels are minted in nickel-plated steel, containing a small amount of copper. Due to the aforementioned rise in nickel prices, since 1982, five-cent pieces composed of 99.9% nickel have been slowly removed from circulation to be melted by the Royal Canadian Mint. Only cupronickel and modern multi-ply plated steel five-cent pieces are considered "circulation coins". As a result, pre-1982 five cent pieces are often sought by collectors.

From 1942 to 1963, Canadian five-cent coins were produced in a distinctive 12-sided shape, evocative of the British threepence coin. Originally this was done to distinguish the copper-coloured tombac coins, from pennies. However, the characteristic shape was retained for another nineteen years after 1944 when this coin was later produced in 99.9% nickel and chrome-plated steel.

The coin is produced by the Royal Canadian Mint at its facility in Winnipeg.

History

The first ever Canadian five-cent coins were struck by the Royal Mint in London as part of the introductory 1858 coinage of the Province of Canada.  The coins were the same size and general composition as the corresponding American coins of the time, so the five-cent coin was based on the half dime.  Although the American denomination was introduced as a larger copper-nickel coin in 1866, and the five-cent silver was retired in 1873, the Canadian five-cent coins remained small and silver until 1922.

All Canadian coins (including five-cent coins) were struck in England at the Royal Mint (no mint mark) and the Birmingham Mint (H mint mark) until 1908, when the Ottawa branch of the Royal Mint opened.  With the exception of some 1968 dimes struck at the Philadelphia Mint, all Canadian coins since 1908 have been minted in Canada.

Due to a rise in the price of silver, Canadian coinage was debased from sterling silver (925 fine) to 800 fine in 1920.  In 1922, silver was removed entirely from the five-cent coin, replacing it with a coin of roughly the same dimensions and mass as the American nickel.  However, unlike the American coin, which was 75% copper and 25% nickel, the Canadian coin was pure nickel, as Canada was the world's largest producer of the metal.  This coin has since been known almost universally as the nickel.

The five-cent coin of Newfoundland, on the other hand, remained silver until the end of the Newfoundland coinage in 1947.

The nickel's composition has changed several times, most notably during World War II and the Korean War when nickel was redirected to the war effort, where it was essential for armour production.  In the latter part of 1942 and throughout 1943, the coins were minted in tombac, an 88% copper-12% zinc alloy that got its name originally from the Indonesian/Javanese word for brass or copper. In 1944 and 1945, and again from mid-1951 to 1954, coins were made of steel which was plated twice, first with nickel and then chromium.  The plating was applied before the blanks were struck, so the edges of these coins are dull or even rusted.  The composition was returned to pure nickel after both wars.  More recently, in 1982, the same copper-nickel alloy used in the American coin was adopted in the Canadian coin, with the ironic result that the nickel then contained less nickel than any other circulating Canadian coin except the cent.  Since late in 2000, the nickel is now generally made with plated steel.  Since the plating is now done after the blanks are punched, the edges of the modern coins receive the plating. Portions of the 2001 and 2006 issues were struck in cupronickel, and can be identified by the lack of the letter "P" under Queen Elizabeth's portrait, and for their non-magnetic quality.

Starting with the 1942 tombac coins, the nickel was made dodecagonal, presumably to help distinguish it from the cent after it tarnished in circulation. Tombac was removed from the nickel in 1944 (to be replaced by steel, as noted during the Korean war) but the coins in Tombac, steel, or 99.9% nickel all remained twelve-sided until 1963.

All of these coins were lighter than the US version, which is minted to be as close as possible to five grams. Canadian 99.9% nickel five-cent coins are nearly 0.5 gram lighter than this, and its present steel coins are a full gram lighter than US "nickels."

1921 five-cent coin
Five-cent coins dated 1921 are among the rarest and most collectible Canadian circulation coins, known as "The Prince of Canadian Coins." Estimates of the number of specimens known range between 400 and 480. In May 1921 the government of Canada passed an act authorizing the change to the larger nickel coin, and subsequently the majority of the 1921 mint run was melted down. It was then sold by the Canadian Numismatic Company for $160,000 to a private collector in early 2012.

Types and specifications

Commemorative nickels
Although not strictly a commemorative, the "Victory nickel", struck from 1943 to 1945, was the first non-standard circulating Canadian coin other than commemorative dollars; the reverse features a flaming torch and a large V that stands for both Victory and the coin's denomination.  The rim denticles were replaced by the phrase "We win when we work willingly" in Morse Code.  This design was re-used in 2005 to commemorate the 60th anniversary of V-E Day.  Almost uniquely in the history of Canadian coinage, the reverse was engraved to scale by Thomas Shingles; most coin designs are engraved at a much larger scale and reduced with a pantograph.

In 1951, a special commemorative five-cent piece depicting a nickel refinery was struck to celebrate the 200th anniversary of the metal's initial discovery by Swedish chemist Axel F. Cronstedt.  Due to the onset of the Korean War, production of this commemorative was halted to preserve nickel for the war effort, resulting in a second non-commemorative 1951 "nickel" made of plated steel.

In 1967, all the circulating coins received a special reverse for the Canadian Centennial; the nickel featured a rabbit.

In proof sets issued since 1996, the five cent coin is made of sterling silver. Some commemorative five cent coins are also made of sterling silver.

Mintage

See also

 Big Nickel

References

External links
 
Value of Canadian Nickel

1858 establishments in Canada
Five-cent coins
Coins of Canada
Coin
Beavers